Chatou is a commune in the Yvelines department in the Île-de-France region in north-central France.

History
On May 31, 1875, part of the territory of Chatou was detached and merged with a part of the territory of Le Pecq and a part of the territory of Croissy-sur-Seine to create the commune of Le Vésinet. It boasts many bourgeois mansions of every kind of architecture and owned by private individuals.

Chatou is also the host of the Maison Fournaise, a meeting place for Impressionist painters in the past. It was a place where Pierre-Auguste Renoir painted numerous pieces (portraits of the Fournaise family, surrounding landscapes etc.), most notably the Déjeuner des canotiers (Luncheon of the Boating Party) in 1881. The painting is today part of the Phillips Collection in Washington, D.C.

On August 25, 1944, in Chatou, the nazis shot 27 people, civilians and members of the French Resistance. This event is today known as the "Massacre des 27 Martyrs".

Population

Transport
Chatou is served by Chatou–Croissy station on Paris RER line A.

Education
The community has eight public preschools, five public elementary schools, and two public junior high schools. Schools include:

Elementary:
 Les Champs-Moutons
 Jules Ferry
 Victor Hugo
 Jean Rostand
 Val Fleuri

Junior high schools:
 Collège Paul Bert
 Collège Auguste Renoir

There are also the following private schools:
 École Jeanne d'Arc / Notre-Dame (preschool and primary school)
 École Perceval (preschool through senior high school)

Lycée Alain, a public senior high school/sixth form college; as well as Institut du Bon Sauveur, a private school with levels preschool through senior high/sixth form, are in nearby Le Vésinet.

Parks and recreation
Parks include:
 Parc des Impressionnistes
 Parc Auguste Renoir
 Parc de l’Europe 
 Jardin du Sentier de la Côte
 Square Emile Pathé
 Square Réalier-Dumas
 Hameau Fournaise, Île des Impressionnistes

See also
 Communes of the Yvelines department

References

External links

 Official website (in French)

Communes of Yvelines